Basavaraj Shivalingappa Horatti is an Indian politician who is the current Chairman of the Karnataka Legislative Council from 9 February 2021, and its member since c. 1980. He has also previously once served as the Chairman of Karnataka Legislative Council from 21 June 2018 to 12 December 2018. He has been a longest-serving member of the Karnataka Legislative Council since 1980, winning eight consecutive terms.

Horatti had previously served as the Minister for Primary Education and
Minister for Small Savings in the Government of Karnataka.

References

Living people
Place of birth missing (living people)
Janata Dal (Secular) politicians
Karnataka MLCs 2014–2020
Chairs of the Karnataka Legislative Council
1946 births
Bharatiya Janata Party politicians from Karnataka